Kimi Hsia Yu-chiao (born 24 August 1984) is a Taiwanese actress and television host. She is best known for hosting the SET Metro variety shows Delicious Food All Over the World and Stylish Man – The Chef.

Career 
Hsia was discovered by producer Wang Wei-chung when she was 15. She participated in the show Guess and won first place in the junior high school beauty contest segment and was signed by Wang's company.

In 2013 she starred, alongside Tony Yang and Lin Mei-hsiu, in the film Zone Pro Site, which topped the Taiwanese box office for four consecutive weeks. She has also appeared in television series such as The Pawnshop No. 8 (2003), The Queen of SOP (2012), What Is Love (2012), Rock N' Road (2014) and Thirty Something (2015).

Filmography

Television series

Film

Variety show

Music video appearances

Theater

Songwriting credits

Published works

Awards and nominations

References

External links 
 
 

1984 births
Living people
Taiwanese television actresses
Taiwanese film actresses
Taiwanese stage actresses
21st-century Taiwanese actresses
Actresses from Taipei
Taiwanese television presenters
Taiwanese women television presenters